Descampsina is a genus of bristle flies in the family Tachinidae.

Species
Descampsina sesamiae Mesnil, 1956

Distribution
Cameroon, Congo, Nigeria.

References

Exoristinae
Tachinidae genera
Diptera of Africa
Monotypic Brachycera genera